The Rev. Archibald Henry Sayce (25 September 18454 February 1933) was a pioneer British Assyriologist and linguist, who held a chair as Professor of Assyriology at the University of Oxford from 1891 to 1919. He was able to write in at least twenty ancient and modern languages, and was known for his emphasis on the importance of archaeological and monumental evidence in linguistic research. He was a contributor to articles in the 9th, 10th and 11th editions of the Encyclopædia Britannica.

Life 
Sayce was born in Shirehampton, near Bristol, on 25 September 1845. Although the start of his education was delayed due to ill health he had suffered since birth, Sayce was a quick learner. When his first tutor was appointed in 1855, he was already reading works in Latin and Ancient Greek. He began his formal education at Grosvenor College shortly after his family moved to Bath in 1858. By the age of 18, he had already taught himself to read some Ancient Egyptian, Sanskrit and Hebrew and had become interested in cuneiform. He published his first academic paper, Cuneiform inscriptions of Van in 1865.

In 1865 he became a classical scholar at The Queen's College, Oxford. While a student at Oxford, Sayce became friends with Max Müller, John Rhys, John Ruskin and Henry Acland. Due to his poor health, Sayce spent time away from Oxford, and carried out his studies at home and on visits to the Pyrenees and Switzerland. Sayce achieved a first-class in Classical Moderations (Greek and Latin) in 1866 and in Literae Humaniores (Philosophy and Ancient History) in 1868, and was elected to a vacant Fellowship in the same year.

In 1869 Sayce was appointed a lecturer at Queen's College. He was ordained a priest in the Church of England in 1870. Ongoing problems with his sight almost led to the end of his Oxford career and Sayce spent much of his time travelling Europe. It was only from 1874, when he came under the supervision of ophthalmologist Richard Liebreich, that Sayce was able to continue his academic career. In the same year he was appointed as the university's representative in the Old Testament Revision Company. Sayce also began to deliver lectures to the Nineveh Society of Biblical Archaeology and contributed to The Times and the New York Independent. In 1876 Sayce was appointed the Deputy Professor of Comparative Philology, a role shared with the continuing Professor, Max Müller, who wanted to reduce his duties.

From 1872, Sayce spent most of his summers travelling for his health and in search of new texts. In 1879 he resigned from his tutorship at Oxford to dedicate his time to his research and exploring the near East. In 1881, Sayce was one of the first scholars to examine the Siloam Inscription, which he described in the Palestine Exploration Fund Quarterly. Sayce resigned his professorship in 1890 and briefly moved to Egypt, where he was instrumental in the reopening of the Museum of Cairo in 1891. In 1891, Sayce returned to Oxford to become the university's first Professor of Assyriology.

Lectures were his favourite vehicle for publication, and he published his Hibbert Lectures on Babylonian religion in 1887. Sayce was also the Gifford Lecturer, 1900–1902; and Rhind Lecturer, 1906.

Sayce was a founding member of the Society of Biblical Archaeology, which he presided from 1898 until it was absorbed into the Royal Asiatic Society in 1919. He was also an active member of the Royal Asiatic Society from 1874 and a founding member of the Society for the Promotion of Hellenic Studies.

After his retirement in 1915, Sayce continued to write and spent his time in Edinburgh, Oxford and Egypt. By the end of his life, Sayce was considered an amateur rather than a specialist and was criticized for his lack of intellectual penetration and outdated opposition to the work of continental orientalists. In 1923, he published Reminiscences, an account of his life and his numerous travels. At the time of his death he was working on a translation of inscriptions discovered at Ras Shamra. Sayce died on 4 February 1933 in Bath.

Research

Sumerian and Akkadian languages
Sayce's early research examined Sumerian and Akkadian languages. His article An Accadian Seal (1870), includes the discovery of many of the linguistic  principles of Sumerian. Sayce's An Assyrian grammar for comparative purposes (1872), drew attention from established Assyriologists to the 'new' language. In 1874, Sayce published his paper, The Astronomy and Astrology of the Babylonians, one of the first articles to translate astronomical cuneiform texts.

Science of language
Sayce is also seen by some as one of founding fathers of the 'Reform Movement' in linguistic research at the end of the 19th century. His two notable works, Introduction  to the Science of Language (1879), and The Principles of Comparative Philology (1880), introduced audiences to the changing continental linguistic trends in the late 19th and early 20th centuries. The books challenged the current thinking in comparative philology and the importance of what Sayce termed the principle of analogy.

Hittite language
In the late 1870s, Sayce moved away from his Sumerian studies and concentrated upon Indo-European languages. He theorized that the pseudo-sesostris rock carvings in Asia Minor, such as the Karabel relief which had been historically attributed to the Egyptians, were actually created by another pre-Greek culture. In 1876 he speculated that the hieroglyphs in inscriptions discovered at Hamath in Syria, were not related to Assyrian or Egyptian scripts but came from another culture he identified as the Hittites. In 1879, Sayce further theorized that reliefs and inscriptions at Karabel, İvriz, Carchemish, Alaca Höyük, and Yazilikaya were created by the Hittites. His hypothesis was confirmed when he visited some of the sites on a tour of the Near East in the same year. On his return to England, Sayce presented a lecture to the  Society of Biblical Archaeology in London, where he announced that the Hittites where a much more influential culture than previously thought with their own art and language. Sayce concluded that the Hittite hieroglyphic system was predominantly a syllabary, that is, its symbols stood for a phonetic syllable. There were too many different signs for a system that was alphabetical and yet there were too few for it to be a set of ideographs. That very sign standing for the divinity had appeared on the stones of Hamath and other places, always in the form of a prefix of an indecipherable group of hieroglyphics naming the deities. This led Sayce to conclude that by finding the name of one of these deities with the help of another language endowed with similar pronunciation, one might analyse the conversion of the aforesaid name in Hittite hieroglyphics. Also, he stated that the keys to be obtained through that process might in turn be applied to other parts of a Hittite inscription where the same sign were to occur.

Sayce dreamed of finding a Hittite Rosetta Stone to help with his research. Sayce attempted to translate a short Hittite hieroglyphic inscription found with a cuneiform text on a silver disk featuring a representation of the Hittite king, Tarkondemos. He and William Wright also identified the ruins at Boghazkoy with Hattusa, the capital of a Hittite Empire that stretched from the Aegean Sea to the banks of the Euphrates.

Sayce published his research on the Hittites in The Hittites: The Story of a Forgotten Empire in 1888. Sayce produced many studies on the Hittites and their language, but they were criticised by fellow scholars as his work did not apply Historical criticism, and his attempts to decipher the Hittite hieroglyphics were also unsuccessful.

Egyptology
From the early 1880s, Sayce spent most of his winters in Egypt due to his poor health, and became interested in the archaeology of the region. Sayce was friends with Flinders Petrie and worked on cuneiform inscriptions discovered by Petrie at Tel el Amarna.
He worked at El Kab in Egypt with Somers Clarke in the 1900s. In his seasonal winter digs in Egypt he always hired a well-furnished boat on the Nile to accommodate his travelling library, which also enabled him to offer tea to visiting Egyptologists like the young American James Henry Breasted and his wife.

Bibliography

Books
()



,,,()





,

Articles

 

 

 

 

 
 

 

Sayce also wrote a number of articles in the Encyclopædia Britannica, 9th edition (1875–89) and 10th edition (1902-03), including on Babylon, Babylonia and Assyria, and Wilhelm von Humboldt;  Encyclopædia Britannica Eleventh Edition (1911), including on Assur (city), Assur-Bani-Pal, Babylon, Babylonia and Assyria, Belshazzar, Berossus, Caria, Ecbatana, Elam, Esar-haddon, Grammar, Gyges, Karl Wilhelm von Humboldt, Kassites, Laodicea, Lycia, Lydia, Persepolis (in part), Sardanapalus, Sargon, Sennacherib, Shalmaneser, Sippara, and Susa.

Editorials

Primary sources
 A collection of letters by Sayce are held in the Emory University Archives (Manuscript Collection No. 264).
 A collection of Sayce's notes, photographs, squeezes, correspondence, and offprints are held by the Griffith Institute (Collection Sayce MSS)

References

External links

 
 
 
 

 
 
 

1845 births
1933 deaths
People from Shirehampton
Linguists from England
English Assyriologists
Fellows of The Queen's College, Oxford
Statutory Professors of the University of Oxford
British archaeologists
Honorary Fellows of the British Academy
Assyriologists